This is a list of airlines currently operating in Monaco.

See also
 List of airlines
 List of defunct airlines of Europe

Monaco
Airlines
Monaco
Airlines